Beverly Grant (born 25 September 1970) is a former Jamaican sprinter.

External links 

 

1970 births
Living people
Jamaican female sprinters
World Athletics Championships medalists
Athletes (track and field) at the 1999 Pan American Games
Pan American Games medalists in athletics (track and field)
Pan American Games gold medalists for Jamaica
World Athletics Indoor Championships winners
Medalists at the 1999 Pan American Games
20th-century Jamaican women
21st-century Jamaican women